Taxi is the eighth solo studio album by English singer Bryan Ferry, released in March 1993 by Virgin Records, over five years after the late 1987 release of his previous album Bête Noire. It was first released in Japan on 10 March, before being released in the UK on 22 March and then in the US in April. This was Ferry's third solo album since the second demise of Roxy Music in 1983, ten years earlier. The album was a commercial and critical success, peaking at No. 2 in the UK, it was certified Gold by the BPI.

The first single, "I Put a Spell on You" was the album's only top 20 hit in the U.K., peaking at No. 18. The second single, "Will You Love Me Tomorrow" narrowly missed the U.K. top 20, peaking at No. 23. The third and final single, "Girl Of My Best Friend" peaked at 57.

Production and recording
Taxi is a cover album (the closing “Because You’re Mine” is an original). When Ferry was asked about the album, he said "Since I started work on the Taxi album, everything has gone great for me. The last two years have been terrific, but I had three or four miserable years. Doing the Taxi album was the start of getting things right. Just getting something done quickly and efficiently was very gratifying. Finishing something I liked and getting back into singing again, getting away from my own writing temporarily was a good thing."

Critical reception
Reviewing for AllMusic, critic Ned Raggett wrote of the album: "Taxi shows a mature Bryan Ferry, suave and controlled, very much in line with his general career from 1979 on ... Ferry's treated vocals, made to sound weirdly flat and compressed, heightens the curious mood." Reviewing for Entertainment Weekly, critic David Browne wrote of the album: "Few of the remakes have the decadent, jaunty verve of his covers albums of the '70s. But that's okay, since Ferry appears to be aiming for something else: beautifully eerie mood music for the lovesick vampire in us all." Rob Sheffield wrote in his three-star review of the album that "Taxi is a consistently inspired set that ranges from 'Amazing Grace' to 'All Tomorrow's Parties.'"

Track listing

Personnel
Credits are adapted from the album's liner notes.

Musicians
 Bryan Ferry – lead and backing vocals (1-9), acoustic piano (1, 2, 4-10), strings (1, 4, 6, 9, 10), synthesizers (2, 5), organ (3, 6, 7), "witch" (3, 5, 9), arrangements (8), sounds (10)
 Richard Norris – programming (1, 3, 4, 5, 9)
 Greg Phillinganes – strings (1), vibraphone (1), synthesizers (2, 4, 6, 7, 8), harp (8)
 Chris Stainton – Hammond organ (4)
 David Sancious – Hammond organ (8)
 Flaco Jiménez – accordion (8)
 Neil Hubbard – guitar (1), "probe" guitar (2), "trace" guitar (3), lead guitar (4, 7), guitar licks (6, 9), rhythm guitar (8)
 Michael Brook – "atmos" guitar (1, 8), lead guitar (5, 6), "infinite" guitar (10)
 Robin Trower – Fender guitar (1), wah wah guitar (2, 3, 7), "theme" guitar (4), "pin" guitar (5), "pocket" guitar (9), "space" guitar (10)
 David Williams – rhythm guitar (1, 3, 6-9), guitar hook (1), cat sounds (9)
 Nathan East – bass (1-9)
 Steve Pearce – bass (2)
 Steve Ferrone – drums (1-9)
 Michael Giles – drums (9)
 Andy Newmark – drums (9)
 Luís Jardim – percussion (4, 5, 6)
 Maceo Parker – alto saxophone (1)
 Mel Collins – tenor saxophone (5)
 Andy Mackay – alto saxophone (9)
 Carleen Anderson – backing vocals (1, 3-6, 8, 9), lead vocals (10)

Technical
 Bryan Ferry – production
 Robin Trower – production
 Sven Taits – engineering
 Richard Norris – pre-production engineering at Studio One (London)
 Bob Clearmountain – mixing at Bearsville Studios (New York City)
 Bob Ludwig – mastering at Masterdisk (New York City)

Artwork
 Anton Corbijn – photography
 Nick de Ville – art direction
 Bryan Ferry – art direction

Charts

Certifications

References

1993 albums
Bryan Ferry albums
Reprise Records albums
Virgin Records albums